Anantarampur  is a village in Chanditala I community development block of Srirampore subdivision in Hooghly district in the Indian state of West Bengal.

Geography

Gram panchayat
Villages in Haripur gram panchayat are: Anantarampur, Bade Sola, Baghati, Ban Panchbere, Chak Bangla, Chota Choughara, Dudhkomra, Haripur, Ichhapasar, Jagmohanpur, Mamudpur and Radhaballabhpur.

Demographics
As per 2011 Census of India, Anantarampur had a total population of 1,582 of which 845 (53%) were males and 737 (47%) were females. Population below 6 years was 175. The total number of literates in Anantarampur was 1,163 (82.66% of the population over 6 years).

References 

Villages in Chanditala I CD Block